I Am That is a compilation of talks on Shiva Advaita (Nondualism) philosophy by Sri Nisargadatta Maharaj, a Hindu spiritual teacher who lived in Mumbai. The English translation of the book from the original Marathi recordings was done by Maurice Frydman, edited by Sudhakar S. Dixit and first published in 1973 by Chetana Publications. The book was revised and reedited in July 1981. These publications led to the spread of Nisargadatta's teachings to the West, especially North America and Europe. Excerpts of the book were published in Yoga Journal in September 1981, the month Nisargadatta died at age 84.

The book is considered the author's masterpiece and a spiritual classic by authors and teachers like Eckhart Tolle, Wayne Dyer, Deepak Chopra Peter Crone and Adyashanti, who called the book a "standout" and "the clearest expression I've ever found." Dyer calls Nisargadatta his teacher, and cites the quotation, "Love says: 'I am everything'. Wisdom says: 'I am nothing'. Between the two my life flows." That quotation has also been cited by several other authors in diverse fields, from wellness to cooking. Joseph Goldstein visited Nisargadatta in January 1980 after reading the book, and after several meetings said, "The path that Nisargadatta revealed was not a search, but a find, not a struggle, but an abiding, not a cultivation, but something intrinsic to all".

I Am That has been translated into several languages, including Dutch, Italian and Hebrew.

Background and publication history

Nisargadatta Maharaj met his guru, Siddharameshwar Maharaj, in 1933. Siddharameshwar died two and half years later, and Nisargadatta continued to practice what his guru had taught him while running a small shop in Khetwadi locality in Girgaon, Mumbai. In 1951, after receiving an inner revelation from his guru, he began to give initiations. He allowed devotees to gather twice a day for satsang, with meditation, bhajan-singing, and the answering of questions, continuing until his death on 8 September 1981, at the age of 84.

Maurice Frydman, a Jewish refugee from Warsaw, came to India in the late 1930s. Initially, he worked at the State Government Electric Factory in Bangalore. Later, influenced by Mahatma Gandhi, he worked in Aundh State (the present Satara district) on the Aundh Experiment for local self-governance. Thereafter he took sannyas (renunciation). He was associated with Sri Ramana Maharshi and J. Krishnamurti. Eventually he became a disciple of Sri Nisargadatta Maharaj in the early days of Nisargadatta's spiritual work in 1965. Frydman spoke Marathi and so became a translator of Nisargadatta's talks. He recorded and compiled the sessions, leading to the publication of I Am That.

Most of the conversations were in Marathi, but for the benefit of Westerners talks were often translated. Frydman:
″Whenever I was present the task would fall to me. Many of the questions put and answers given were so interesting and significant that a tape-recorder was brought in. While most of the tapes were of the regular Marathi-English variety, some were polyglot scrambles of several Indian and European languages. Later, each tape was deciphered and translated into English″
.

All the conversations were recorded at Nisargadatta's small tenement and later transcribed and translated by Frydman while the master was still unknown to the Western public. A Marathi version of the talks, verified by Nisargadatta, was published separately.

According to Nisargadatta, "Maurice (Frydman) told me, 'Everything that is said here is immediately lost, though it could be of a great benefit for those looking for truth. I would like to translate and publish your words so others might know them. And so, he wrote I Am That".

With the book's publication, Nisargadatta became very popular: hundreds of foreigners started flocking to his small tenement, and Nisargadatta once remarked: ″I used to have a quiet life but the book I Am That by Maurice has turned my house into a railway station platform.″

I Am That was initially rejected by the major publishers, so Frydman worked with a then small publisher, Chetana Publications. The book was first published in 1973 in two hardcover volumes. The revised and enlarged second edition was published in one volume in 1976. The first paperback was published in 1984. The book is now published in the USA and Canada by The Acorn Press.

Structure

The book comprises 101 sections, each corresponding to a particular conversation, averaging four pages each and cast in a question-and-answer format. Most deal with a single issue but some go from one subject to other, always in line with the spiritual quest. The second edition includes an epilogue, Nisarga Yoga, by Maurice Frydman.

Style of teaching in I Am That

Nisargadatta's teachings are grounded in the Advaita Vedanta interpretation of the Advaita idea Tat Tvam Asi, literally "That Thou Art", (Tat = "Absolute", Tvam = "You", Asi = "are") meaning "You are (actually) Absolute" (who think otherwise). Nisargadatta also had a strong devotion to his own guru, and suggested the path of devotion, Bhakti yoga, to some of his visitors.

Nisargadatta deviated from the formal Navnath Sampradaya lineage style of teaching by giving informal discourses for the benefit of Western devotees who did not have access to Dasbodh or other texts, and who were not familiar with Indian traditions and customs.

It has been said that Nisargadatta´s style was direct, and even at times aggressive. He very rarely mentioned scriptures or quoted spiritual books. His teachings came from his own experience.

Nisarga Yoga 
Nisargadatta taught what has been called Nisarga Yoga (Nisarga can be translated as “the natural state”). In I Am That, Nisarga Yoga is defined as living life with “harmlessness,” “friendliness,” and “interest,” abiding in “spontaneous awareness” while being “conscious of effortless living.” The practice of this form of Yoga involves meditating on one’s sense of "I am" or "being" with the aim of reaching its ultimate source, which Nisargadatta called the Self. 

The Seven Principles of Nisarga Yoga (As identified by Nic Higham, 2018)

 Non-identification and right understanding
 Interest and earnestness
 Spontaneity and effortlessness
 Attentiveness to being
 Right action
 Going within to go beyond
 Awareness of Self

See also
Samarth Ramdas
Advaita vedanta
Navnath Sampradaya
Siddharameshwar Maharaj

References

Bibliography

External links

 I AM THAT - By Nisargadatta Maharaj
 nisargadatta.net
 Farsi Translation of the book
Nondualism
Philosophical literature
1973 non-fiction books
Indian non-fiction books
20th-century Indian books
Hinduism studies books
Books about spirituality
Advaita Vedanta
English-language books